Arthur Lewis Acker (July 17, 1891 – December 24, 1990) was an American football, basketball, baseball, track and field, tennis, and boxing coach. He served as the head football coach at Chico State College—renamed from Chico State Teachers College in 1935 and now known as California State University, Chico—from 1923 to 1937, compiling a record of 53–59–8. Acker was also the head basketball coach at Chico State from 1924 to 1947, tallying a mark of 339–205.

Acker graduated from Millikin University in Decatur, Illinois in 1917. At Millikin, he played football and basketball and ran track. Acker began his coaching career in 1917 when he was hired as head football coach at Owensboro High School in Owensboro, Kentucky. He coached the freshmen team at Stanford University in 1919 and 1920. Acker came to Chico State in 1923 after coach for three years at Preston School of Industry in Ione, California.

Head coaching record

College football

References

1891 births
1990 deaths
Chico State Wildcats baseball coaches
Chico State Wildcats football coaches
Chico State Wildcats men's basketball coaches
Millikin Big Blue football players
Millikin Big Blue men's basketball players
Stanford Cardinal football coaches
College boxing coaches in the United States
College tennis coaches in the United States
College men's track and field athletes in the United States
College track and field coaches in the United States
High school football coaches in Kentucky
Sportspeople from Cleveland